The University of Southern Mindanao (USM), formerly Mindanao Institute of Technology (MIT), is a university in the Southern Philippines. It provides instruction and professional training in the fields of science and technology, particularly agriculture and industry. The university was founded by Bai Hadja Fatima Matabay Plang, an educator and philanthropist. It formally open on October 1, 1954, and achieved university status on March 13, 1978. Its 1,024 hectare main campus is located in Kabacan, Cotabato. The University of Southern Mindanao is one of the four State University and Colleges (SUC) to achieve excellence in agricultural education and one of the nine to hold Level IV status. Across its 3 campuses USM holds a total of 5,129.97 hectares of land, mostly for agricultural teaching and research.

History
The USM main campus used to be a rubber plantation owned and managed by a Scot named Fleming, who was granted an area of 1,024 hectares in 1909. The ownership changed hands several times until the Japanese occupation, when it came under the control of Ohta Development Company. After the Americans defeated the Japanese in 1944, this compound was taken over by the United States government until 1947, when it was transferred to the Philippine government. It was not until the 1950s that the Maguindanao princess, Bai Hadja Fatima Matabay Plang, started the movement to establish the Mindanao Institute of Technology (MIT). She was supported in this venture by Datu Udtog Matalam, then governor of Empire Province, Cotabato, and by congressman Salipada Pendatun (who later became house speaker).

President Elpidio Quirino signed R.A. 763, the law creating the Mindanao Institute of Technology, on June 20, 1952. On June 10, 1954, President Ramon Magsaysay signed republic act no. 998, the enabling act for the establishment and subsequent operation for MIT, with an initial allocation of P 200,000 for the school’s operation.

On March 13, 1978 President Ferdinand E. Marcos signed presidential decree no. 1312 which converted the Mindanao Institute of Technology into a university. Dr. Jaman S. Imlan was the first university president. As a university USM was mandated to have a three key roles: instruction, research, and extension. A fourth, resource generation, was later added.

The university's key function is teaching and instruction, this is carried out by almost 500 faculty members.

Instruction
Instruction is provided for tertiary and advanced level courses. The ten colleges, one institute and 2 extension campuses offer a total of 46 degree courses. In addition, the university maintains laboratories for its teacher training programme and special short courses. It also offers special programs and special courses.

Main/Kabacan Campus
College of Agriculture
College of Arts and Social Sciences
College of Business, Development Economics and Management
College of Education
College of Engineering and Information Technology
College of Health Sciences
College of Human Ecology and Food Sciences
College of Medicine
College of Middle East and Asian Studies
College of Science and Mathematics
Institute of Sports, Physical Education and Recreation
College of Trade and Industries
College of Veterinary Medicine
Graduate School

Other Campuses
USM Buluan Campus
USM Kidapawan City Campus
USM Libungan Campus
USM Alamada Campus

Research
Research is a major function of the university. Research activities are mostly carried out by its research arms: the University of Southern Mindanao Agricultural Research Center (USMARC) and the Philippine Industrial Crops Research Institute (PICRI). USMARC is the national research center for corn, sorghum, and fruit crops; the regional center for rice and other cereals, livestock and farming systems, water resources, applied rural sociology, cut flowers, and ornamental plants; and a cooperating station for coconut and vegetable crops. PICRI is the national research institute for rubber, fiber crops, coffee, spices, cacao, and other industrial crops. Attached to PICRI is the Philippine Rubber Testing Center (PRTC), for dried natural rubber. USM hosts two organized bodies which do research and development activities: the Cotabato Agricultural and Resources Research and Development Consortium (CARRDEC), a research consortium of agencies in Central Mindanao and the Philippine Carabao Center (PCC), a member of the national PCC network.

Extension
Coordinated by the University's Extension Office, extension work is carried out by the colleges and research units, either on their own or in collaboration with other government agencies and private organizations. Provision of extension services takes the form of training various clientele groups, most of whom are farmers; technical assistance to sectors; social laboratory projects; demonstration farms; consultancy services and public education, through personal contacts and mass media (radio, print, and video).

Resource generation
The USM's resource generation program generates a sizeable income to augment the operating fund of the university and serves as a laboratory for horticulture, animal science, agronomy, and agribusiness. Research areas include rice and corn; buffalo, cattle and sheep; swine; poultry; durian, lanzones, mango, calamansi and other citrus fruits; coconut, banana, marang, guyabano, rambutan, and pineapple. The USM is noted for its OPV corn seeds and quality grafted/budded seedlings of fruit and plantation crops. USM hostels also host self-sustaining business ventures or income generation projects (IGP).

Facilities and research centers
University Hospital
1000 watts radio station (dxVL KOOL FM, PBS-affiliate)
Hostel and Function Hall
Philippine Industrial Crops Research Institute (PICRI) 
University of Southern Mindanao Agricultural Research Center (USMARC)
Philippine Carabao Center (PCC) a member of PCC Network
Philippine Rubber Testing Center (PRTC)
Cotabato Agricultural and Resources Research and Development Consortium (CARRDEC)
Veterinary Hospital
Soils and Plant Laboratory Analysis
Molecular and Tissue Culture Laboratory

Affiliation and links 
USM maintains affiliations and links to both local and international government, non-governmental organizations (NGO), private-sector companies and academic institutions for research, development, extension and teaching.

Publication
The university produces several publications. The USM Press, USM Monitor, Techno Guide, USM R & D Journal. The University student magazine is Mindanao Tech. Every college and institute has its own student publication.

References

Universities and colleges in Cotabato
State universities and colleges in the Philippines
Mindanao Association State Colleges and Universities Foundation